William Eugene Stumpf (March 1, 1936 – August 30, 2006) was an American furniture designer who helped design the Aeron, Embody and Ergon chairs for Herman Miller.

It was at the University of Wisconsin-Madison where Stumpf, working with specialists in orthopedic and vascular medicine, conducted extensive research into ergonomics, specifically in the way people sit. In 1974, Herman Miller commissioned him to apply his research to office seating. Two years later, the Ergon chair was introduced.

Biography

Stumpf was born in St. Louis, Missouri. His father died when he was 13, and his mother, a gerontology nurse, relocated the family to Winona, Minnesota, to be near her family.

He served in the U.S. Navy and then earned a bachelor's in industrial design from the University of Illinois at Urbana-Champaign, and a master's in environmental design from the University of Wisconsin–Madison.

Stumpf's association with Herman Miller began in 1970 when he joined the staff of the Herman Miller Research Corporation. After establishing his own firm in 1972, Stumpf created the Ergon chair, the first ergonomic work chair. Later, in collaboration with Don Chadwick, he produced the groundbreaking Equa and iconic Aeron chairs. He also was principal designer for the Ethospace system.

Stumpf's death at age 70 was attributed to complications from abdominal surgery. He was married to Sharon Stumpf, and has five grandchildren: Gabriella, Erin, Max, David and Julia.

Publications 

 Friedman, Mildred, Ed. A Serious Chair — Design Quarterly 126. Minneapolis and Cambridge: The Walker Art Center and Massachusetts Institute of Technology, 1984. 
 Stumpf, William. Ice Palace That Melted Away: How Good Design Enhances Our Lives. New York: Pantheon Books, 1998. 
 Amy Auscherman, Sam Gawe, Leon Ransmeier, eds. "Ergon Chairs 1976" in Herman Miller A Way of Living. London: Phaidon Press, 2019. 430-487

References

Further reading
 Bill Stumpf, The Ice Palace That Melted Away: How Good Design Enhances Our Lives, 192 pages,    University of Minnesota Press(2000), .

External links
 Staff and Wire Reports. (2006, September 2). Bill Stumpf, 70; Designer Helped Create the Aeron Office Chair. The Los Angeles Times

American furniture designers
University of Illinois Urbana-Champaign alumni
University of Wisconsin–Madison College of Letters and Science alumni
1936 births
2006 deaths